Summerville Historic District is a national historic district located at Summerville, Dorchester County, South Carolina. The district encompasses 700 contributing buildings in the village of Summerville. About 70 percent of the buildings predate World War I. The buildings include raised cottages, Greek Revival influenced, and Victorian / Queen Anne and other turn of the 20th century structures are found throughout. In addition to residential structures, the district includes churches and commercial buildings—most dating from around 1900.  Notable buildings include Tupper's Drug Store, O. J. Sire's Commercial Building, White Gables, Pettigru-Lebby House Gazebo, Summerville Presbyterian Church, Wesley United Methodist Church, and the Squirrel Inn.

It was added to the National Register of Historic Places in 1976.

References

Historic districts on the National Register of Historic Places in South Carolina
Greek Revival architecture in South Carolina
Queen Anne architecture in South Carolina
Buildings and structures in Dorchester County, South Carolina
National Register of Historic Places in Dorchester County, South Carolina
Summerville, South Carolina